Ibrahim Abdul Rahim Ayew (born 16 April 1988), also known as Ibrahim Ayew or Rahim Ayew, is a Ghanaian professional footballer who plays as a defensive midfielder for Gibraltar National League club Bruno's Magpies. He formerly played for the Ghana national team.

Club career
Ayew began to play football at Adisadel College, and later started his professional career with his father's team F.C. Nania and was in January 2009 transferred to Eleven Wise. He agreed to sign for German club TSG Hoffenheim, signing on a three and a half year contract, but the deal never materialized. On 17 June 2009, after much speculation, then 21-year-old Ghanaian national player joined from Sekondi Wise Fighters to Egyptian giants El Zamalek FC, where he signed a five-year contract. In January 2011, he signed a contract with Lierse S.K. in the Jupiler League in Belgium. He became a free agent in July 2013 after a two-season stint with Lierse and then for 5 months, he tried to look for a team to play. In December 2013, he returned to Ghana, signing with Asante Kotoko.
In 2016, Ayew moved to Gibraltar to sign with Premier Division side Europa. Used as a left-back in the side, he scored his first goal on 19 March 2017 against Europa Point. After 5 years at the club, Ayew left Europa in summer 2021. However, he returned to football a year later to sign for league rivals Bruno's Magpies, first appearing in their inaugural UEFA Europa Conference League squad to face Crusaders on 7 July 2022.

International career
Ayew has played for Ghana at the U-17, U-20,U-23 and the Senior Team levels.  He was also called up for the Friendly game from the Ghana national football team against Mali national football team and plays the game alongside his younger brother André Ayew. He also played in the just ended African cup of nations in Angola and placed 2nd in the 2010 tournament. He also featured in the CAF African Nations Cup Tournament (CHAN) and placed 2nd again in that tournament with Rahim voted twice as Man of the match in 2009. He was selected, together with his brother André Ayew as part of Ghana's 23-man team for the 2010 World Cup staged in South Africa.

Personal life
Abdul Rahim comes from a family of footballers. He is the half brother of André, Jordan and Imani, having the same father, Ghana's renowned ex captain Abédi Pelé. Abedi and his first wife had Rahim, before Abedi married Maha, mother of Abedi's other children. Rahim is the nephew of Sola Ayew and Ghana's retired ex striker Kwame Ayew.

Honours
Nania
 E. K. Nayanar Memorial Football Gold Cup: 2007

Asante Kotoko
 Ghana Premier League: 2013–14
 Ghanaian FA Cup: 2013–14
 Ghana Super Cup: 2014

Europa
 Gibraltar Premier Division: 2016–17
 Rock Cup: 2017, 2017–18, 2019

References

External links
 Profile
 
 Abdul Rahim Ayew – goalzz.com

Living people
Ghanaian footballers
Ghanaian expatriate footballers
Association football fullbacks
Europa F.C. players
F.C. Nania players
Sekondi Wise Fighters players
Zamalek SC players
Lierse S.K. players
Asante Kotoko S.C. players
F.C. Bruno's Magpies players
Ghanaian expatriate sportspeople in Egypt
2010 Africa Cup of Nations players
Belgian Pro League players
Expatriate footballers in Egypt
Expatriate footballers in Belgium
2010 FIFA World Cup players
Ghanaian Muslims
Egyptian Premier League players
Ghana international footballers
Expatriate footballers in Gibraltar
Ghanaian expatriate sportspeople in Gibraltar
Ayew family
Ghanaian people of Lebanese descent
Sportspeople of Lebanese descent
People from Tamale, Ghana
Ghana A' international footballers
2009 African Nations Championship players
1988 births